The 1995 Saskatchewan Roughriders finished in 6th place in the North Division with a 6–12 record and failed to make the playoffs. This season represented the first time that Regina hosted the Grey Cup, when the city hosted the 83rd championship game. As a result, temporary seating was installed, which led to the largest attendance at a regular season game, 55,438, against the visiting Calgary Stampeders.

Offseason

CFL Draft

Preseason

Regular season

Season Standings

Season schedule

Awards and records

1995 CFL All-Stars

Don Narcisse, Wide Receiver

Northern All-Star Selections

Don Narcisse, Wide Receiver

References

Saskatchewan Roughriders seasons
Saskatchewan Roughriders Season, 1995